The Marriage Clause is a 1926 silent film drama directed by Lois Weber and starring Francis X. Bushman and Billie Dove. It was produced and released by Universal Pictures. The film marked a return to directing for Weber, who had taken a break for a few years.

The film—based on Dana Burnet's Saturday Evening Post short story titled Technic—takes a look behind the scenes of a play, honing in on a young starlet named Sylvia (Dove) and her director, Barry (Bushman).

The copy held by the Library of Congress is stated to be in a "shortened" version.

Cast
Francis X. Bushman - Barry Townsend
Billie Dove - Sylvia Jordan
Warner Oland - Max Ravenal
Henri La Garde - Doctor
Grace Darmond - Mildred Le Blanc
Carolynne Snowden - Pansy (*as Caroline Snowden)
Oscar Smith - Sam
André Cheron - Critic
Robert Dudley - Secretary 
Charles Meakin - Stage Manager

References

External links
The Marriage Clause @ IMDb.com

lobby poster

1926 films
American silent feature films
Films directed by Lois Weber
Universal Pictures films
American black-and-white films
1926 drama films
Silent American drama films
1920s American films